= Old Union Fountain =

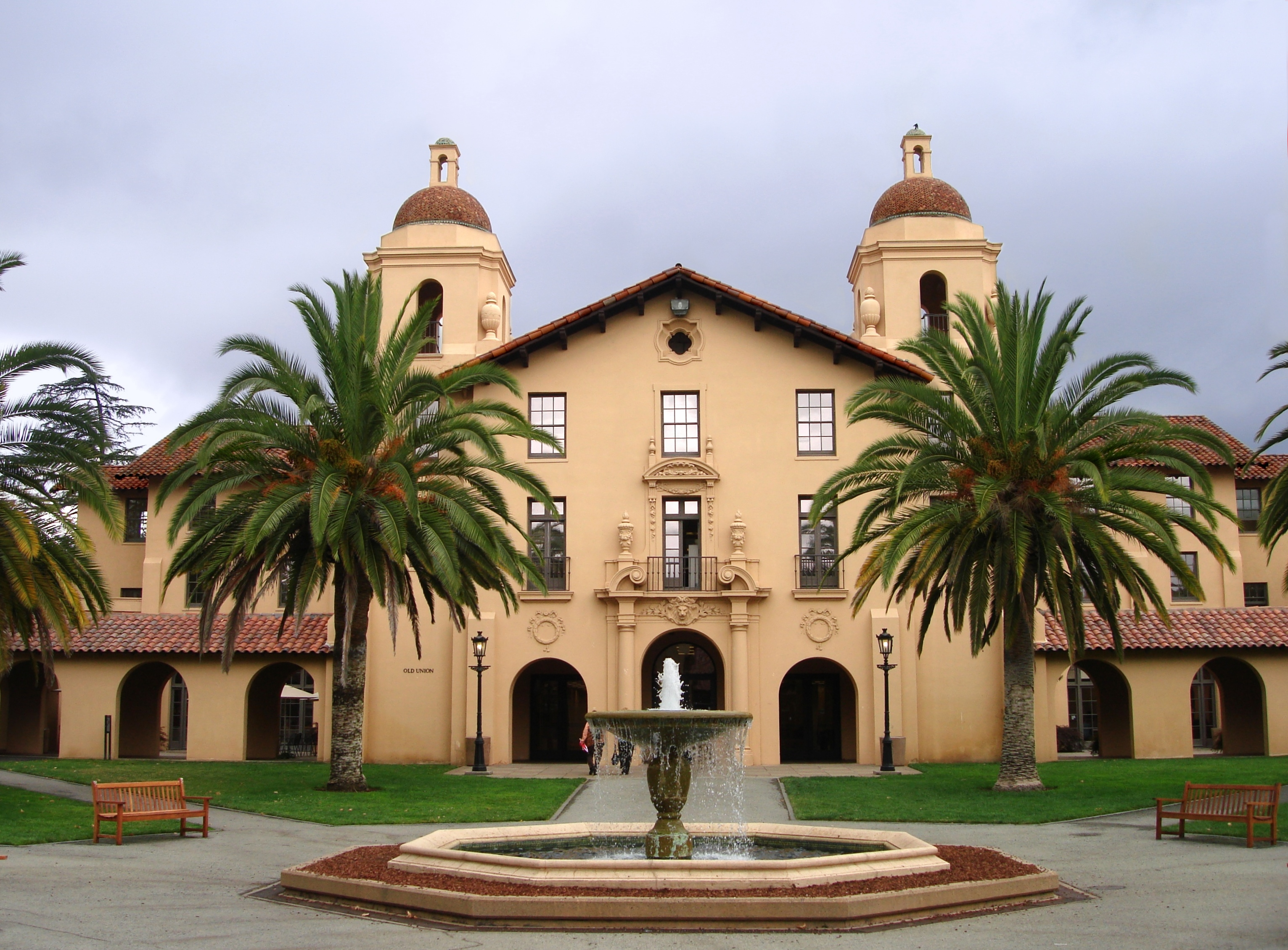
- The fountain in front of Old Union, 2013
- Location: Stanford, California, U.S.
- 37.425093°N 122.169954°W

Old Union Fountain is a fountain on the Stanford University campus in Stanford, California, United States. The fountain exhibits traditional mission style architecture, and is one of several on campus used in the tradition of "fountain hopping".
